Love, Gilda is a 2018 American-Canadian documentary film directed and co-produced by Lisa Dapolito. The film is about the life and career of American comedian Gilda Radner. Love, Gilda premiered on April 18, 2018 at the Tribeca Film Festival and was limited released in the United States on September 21, 2018. The movie received widespread acclaim from critics.

Synopsis
The film presents the life and career of Gilda Radner through her own eyes using her diaries, audio tapes, home movies and interviewing some of her closest friends at that time.

Cast
 Gilda Radner (archive footage)
 Amy Poehler
 Melissa McCarthy
 Bill Hader
 Chevy Chase
 Janis Hirsch
 Lorne Michaels
 Jordan Walker-Pearlman
 Laraine Newman
 Maya Rudolph
 Stephen Schwartz
 Alan Zweibel
 Rosie Shuster
 Martin Short
 Andrew Alexander
 Anne Beatts
 Robin Zweibel
 Michael Radner
 Paul Shaffer

Reception
The site's critical consensus reads: "Love, Gilda pays gentle, unequivocal tribute to its subject with more than enough of her genuine spirit to compensate for a lack of critical distance or truly fresh insight." Metacritic, which uses a weighted average, assigned a score of 74 out of 100, based on 26 critics, indicating "generally favorable reviews".

David Fear from Rolling Stone however gave the film two and a half stars out of five, stating: "In terms of both professional best-of moments and personal artifacts (home movies, old pics, those journals and cassette recordings), the filmmaker has a treasure trove at her fingertips; she just doesn't seem to know how to shape much of it, or how to mine it for more than checkpoints and pop-psychological carping about comedy and pain."

Matt Zoller Seitz writing for the website RogerEbert.com gave Love, Gilda three out of four stars and said: "Director Lisa D'Apolito's documentary is at its best detailing Radner's struggle to make her voice heard in a field that she adored, but that wasn't often hospitable to women, even when the individual men in it thought they were being gracious and inclusive." Jason Zinoman from The New York Times called the film "a portrait of a brief and brilliant career" and completed: "Where the movie succeeds best is as an illumination of her charm and spirit. Ms. Radner played eccentric characters with raucous abandon and jangly big-kid physicality, but she also projected a vulnerability that made you care for them. The movie explores some of her insecurities, particularly with regard to her eating disorder, but its tone never strays too far from the light and breezy."

References

External links
 
 
 Official Trailer on YouTube

2018 documentary films
American documentary films
Canadian documentary films
Saturday Night Live in the 1970s
CNN Films films
2010s English-language films
2010s American films
2010s Canadian films